Marginal zone B and B1 cell-specific protein is a protein that in humans is encoded by the MZB1 gene.

References

Further reading 

 
 
 
 
 
 
 
 
 

Human proteins